"Rise Again" is a song recorded by Canadian music group The Rankin Family. It was released in 1993 as the first single from their third studio album, North Country. It peaked in the top 10 on the RPM Adult Contemporary Tracks chart, and was a Top 20 hit on the magazine's pop chart and a Top 40 hit on its country chart. It received an East Coast Music Award nomination for best song in 1994.

Background and writing
The song was written by Leon Dubinsky, a songwriter from Sydney, Nova Scotia, for a 1984 stage musical titled The Rise and Follies of Cape Breton, as an anthem of resilience and hope at a time when Cape Breton Island was going through an economic crisis. According to Dubinsky, the song is about "the cycles of immigration, the economic insecurity of living in Cape Breton, the power of the ocean, the meaning of children, and the strength of home given to us by our families, our friends and our music."

Other versions
The Rankin Family's rendition, with its lead vocal performed by Raylene Rankin, popularized the song across Canada. As well as the Rankins, the song was also frequently performed in concert by Rita MacNeil, and recorded for her 2001 album Mining the Soul; it was also recorded by Anne Murray for her television special Anne Murray in Nova Scotia, with guest vocal appearances by MacNeil, the Rankins and The Men of the Deeps. The song has also been recorded and performed by Irish singing group, Celtic Thunder.

In popular culture
Because of the song's uplifting spiritual themes, it has been frequently performed by church choirs in Canada. Because of Dubinsky's Jewish faith, it has also sometimes been performed by Jewish groups at commemorations of the Holocaust.

During the COVID-19 pandemic in Canada, the song was covered by Voices Rock Medicine, an ad hoc choir of women health care providers who recorded their parts virtually due to the social distancing restrictions on public gatherings. Their version was included in the television special Stronger Together, Tous Ensemble.

Chart performance

Year-end charts

References

1993 songs
1993 singles
The Rankin Family songs
EMI Records singles